Esil District may also refer to:
 Esil District, North Kazakhstan Region, a district of North Kazakhstan Region in Kazakhstan.
 Esil District, Akmola Region, a district of Akmola Region in Kazakhstan.